Xoes egeria is a species of beetle in the family Cerambycidae, and the only species in the genus Xoes. It was described by Pascoe in 1866.

References

Lamiini
Beetles described in 1866